{{DISPLAYTITLE:C8H14O2}}
The molecular formula C8H14O2 may refer to:

 Butyl methacrylate
 Cypionic acid
 Octalactones
 δ-Octalactone
 γ-Octalactone
 Polyvinyl butyral (repeating unit)